Puerto Plata may refer to:

 Puerto Plata (city), a city in the Dominican Republic
 Gregorio Luperón International Airport, the city airport
 Puerto Plata province, a province of the Dominican Republic
 Puerto Plata (musician) (1923–2020), a Dominican musician